The Indonesia women's national under-16 basketball team is a national basketball team of Indonesia, administered by the Indonesian Basketball Association "PERBASI".

It represents the country in international under-16 (under age 16) women's basketball competitions.

See also
Indonesia women's national basketball team
Indonesia women's national under-18 basketball team
Indonesia men's national under-16 basketball team

References

External links
 Archived records of Indonesia team participations

under
Women's national under-16 basketball teams